Naimat (Mada capital) is a Pakistani Drama Serial directed by Abdullah Badini and written by Naila Ansari. The drama aired on ARY Digital. Zahid Ahmed and Sunita Marshall play the lead roles of Babar and Sara respectively.

Plot
Naimat is a story of Sara (Sunita Marshall) and Babar (Zahid Ahmed), who were a happily married couple, but the surprises of life brings a reason for them to get distant. The trouble in their happy life begins, when they learn that their 5-year-old son Bilal is suffering from a serious heart disease; and since then taking care of Bilal becomes the ultimate reason of Sara's life. Her full attention towards Bilal eventually develops into the reason of her ignorance toward Babar

Cast
Zahid Ahmed as Babar
Sunita Marshall as Sara
Samina Ahmed as Babar's Mother
Kiran Haq  as Zara
Seemi Pasha as Zara's Aunty
Shahood Alvi as Doctor
Ayesha Khan as Doctor's Mother
Badar Khalil as Babar's Mother

References

External links
 ARY Digital programs

ARY Digital
2016 Pakistani television series debuts
Pakistani drama television series
2016 Pakistani television series endings
Urdu-language television shows
ARY Digital original programming